The 1998 NCAA Division I men's soccer tournament was the 39th organized men's college soccer tournament by the National Collegiate Athletic Association, to determine the top college soccer team in the United States. The Indiana Hoosiers won their fourth national title by defeating the Stanford Cardinal in the championship game, 3–1. The final match was played on December 13, 1998, in Richmond, Virginia, at Richmond Stadium for the fourth straight year. All other games were played at the home field of the higher seeded team.

National seeds

Play-in rounds 

Lafayette dft. Dayton 1-0

Early rounds

Final

References

NCAA Division I Mens Soccer
NCAA Division I Men's Soccer Tournament seasons
NCAA Division I men's soccer tournament
NCAA Division I men's soccer tournament